A total solar eclipse occurred at the Moon's descending node of the orbit on July 22, 2009, with a magnitude of 1.07991.  It was the longest total solar eclipse during the 21st century, the longest total solar eclipse during the 3rd millennium will be on 16 July 2186.  It lasted a maximum of 6 minutes and 38.86 seconds off the coast of Southeast Asia, causing tourist interest in eastern China, Pakistan, Japan, India, Nepal and Bangladesh. Its greatest magnitude was 1.07991, occurring only 6 hours, 18 minutes after perigee, with greatest eclipse totality lasting 6 minutes, 38.86 seconds during the Total Solar Eclipse of July 22, 2009.

This was the longest total solar eclipse in the 21st century because totality lasted nearly 6 minutes and 39 seconds.

Eclipse Season 

This is the second eclipse this season, with the first being the July 2009 lunar eclipse. The third eclipse of the season was the August 2009 lunar eclipse.

It was the 37th eclipse of the 136th Saros cycle, which began with a partial eclipse on June 14, 1360, and will conclude with a partial eclipse on July 30, 2622.

Visibility 

A partial eclipse was seen within the broad path of the Moon's penumbra, including most of Southeast Asia (all of Pakistan, India and China) and north-eastern Oceania.

The total eclipse was visible from a narrow corridor through northern India, eastern Nepal, northern Bangladesh, Bhutan, the northern tip of Myanmar, central China and the Pacific Ocean, including the northern part of the Ryukyu Islands, the whole Volcano Islands except South Iwo Jima, Marshall Islands, and Kiribati.

Totality was visible in many large cities, including Dhaka and Dinajpur, and Chapai Nawabganj district in Bangladesh; Surat, Vadodara, Bhopal, Varanasi, Patna, Gaya, Siliguri, Tawang and Guwahati in India;  and Chengdu, Nanchong, Chongqing, Yichang, Jingzhou, Wuhan, Huanggang, Hefei, Hangzhou, Wuxi, Huzhou, Suzhou, Jiaxing, Ningbo, Shanghai as well as over the Three Gorges Dam in China. However, in Shanghai, the largest city in the eclipse's path, the view was obscured by heavy clouds. According to NASA, the Japanese island Kitaio Jima was predicted to have the best viewing conditions featuring both longer viewing time (being the closest point of land to the point of greatest eclipse) and lower cloud cover statistics than all of continental Asia.

The eclipse, and the reaction of thousands of observers at Varanasi was captured by the Science Channel Wonders of the Universe series hosted by Brian Cox.

This eclipse may be the most-viewed total solar eclipse in history, with 30 million people in Shanghai and Hangzhou alone.

Observations

Thousands of pilgrims gathered on the banks of the Ganges River in Varanasi, India to experience the eclipse as a religious or spiritual event.  Some people expected that there would be a relationship, either positive or negative, between their health and the occurrence of the eclipse.

Indian scientists observed the solar eclipse from an Indian Air Force plane.

The Chinese government used the opportunity to provide scientific education and to dispel any superstition. A flight by China Eastern Airlines from Wuhan to Shanghai took a slight detour and followed the course of the eclipse to allow longer observation time for the scientists on board.

Observers in Japan were excited by the prospect of experiencing the first eclipse in 46 years, but found the experience dampened by cloudy skies obscuring the view.

In Bangladesh, where the eclipse lasted approximately 3 minutes and 44 seconds, thousands of people were able to witness the eclipse despite rain and overcast skies.

Duration 

This solar eclipse was the longest total solar eclipse to occur in the 21st century, and will not be surpassed in duration until 13 June 2132 (Saros 139, ascending node). Totality lasted for up to 6 minutes and 38.86 seconds (0.14 seconds shorter than 6 minutes and 39 seconds), with the maximum eclipse occurring in the ocean at 02:35:21 UTC about 100 km south of the Bonin Islands, southeast of Japan. The uninhabited North Iwo Jima island was the landmass with totality time closest to maximum, while the closest inhabited point was Akusekijima, where the eclipse lasted 6 minutes and 26 seconds.

The cruise ship Costa Classica was chartered specifically to view this eclipse and by viewing the eclipse at the point of maximum duration and cruising along the centerline during the event, duration was extended to 6 minutes, 42 seconds.

The eclipse was part of Saros series 136, descending node, as was the solar eclipse of July 11, 1991, which was slightly longer, lasting up to 6 minutes 53.08 seconds (previous eclipses of the same saros series on June 30, 1973, and June 20, 1955, were longer, lasting 7 min 03.55 and 7 min 07.74, respectively). The next event from this series will be on August 2, 2027 (6 minutes and 22.64 seconds). The exceptional duration was a result of the Moon being near perigee, with the apparent diameter of the Moon 7.991% larger than the Sun (magnitude 1.07991) and the Earth being near aphelion where the Sun appeared slightly smaller.

In contrast the annular solar eclipse of January 26, 2009 (Saros 131, ascending node) occurred 3.3 days after lunar apogee and 7.175% smaller apparent diameter to the sun. And the next solar eclipse of January 15, 2010 (Saros 141, ascending node) was also annular, 1.8 days before lunar apogee, with the Moon 8.097% smaller than the Sun.

Photo gallery

Totality

Partial

View from space 

The Terrain Mapping Camera in the Chandrayaan-1 lunar mission was used to image the earth during the eclipse.

It was also observed by the Japanese geostationary satellite MTSAT:

Related eclipses

Eclipses of 2009 
 An annular solar eclipse on January 26.
 A penumbral lunar eclipse on February 9.
 A penumbral lunar eclipse on July 7.
 A total solar eclipse on July 22.
 A penumbral lunar eclipse on August 6.
 A partial lunar eclipse on December 31.

This total eclipse the second in the series of three eclipses in a one-month period, with two minor penumbral lunar eclipses, first on July 7 and last on August 6.

Tzolkinex 
 Preceded: Solar eclipse of June 10, 2002

 Followed: Solar eclipse of September 1, 2016

Half-Saros cycle 
 Preceded: Lunar eclipse of July 16, 2000

 Followed: Lunar eclipse of July 27, 2018

Tritos 
 Preceded: Solar eclipse of August 22, 1998

 Followed: Solar eclipse of June 21, 2020

Solar Saros 136 
 Preceded: Solar eclipse of July 11, 1991

 Followed: Solar eclipse of August 2, 2027

Inex 
 Preceded: Solar eclipse of August 10, 1980

 Followed: Solar eclipse of July 2, 2038

Triad 
 Preceded: Solar eclipse of September 21, 1922

 Followed: Solar eclipse of May 22, 2096

Solar eclipses 2008–2011

Saros series

Metonic cycle

Notes

References
 NASA homepage for July 22, 2009 total solar eclipse
 Interactive map of the eclipse from NASA
 Jay Anderson, Weather and Maps for the Total Solar Eclipse 2009 July 22 00:54 – 04:12 UT

Pre-eclipse news:
 Solar eclipse of July 22, 2009: Time & Place in Indian cities 
 The Longest eclipse of the 21st century time – July 22, 2009
 The 21st century’s longest total solar eclipse to be Internet broadcast worldwide
 How To Watch July 22, 2009 Total Solar Eclipse Live On Web
 City of Brass at Beliefnet.com: The longest solar eclipse of the 21st century
 Solar Eclipse Could Create Chaos AP
 Watch Solar eclipse live from Guwahati 
 July eclipse is best chance to look for gravity anomaly New Scientist
 Solar eclipse: All roads lead to Bihar 

Photos:
 Spaceweather.com gallery
 Total Solar Eclipse, July 22, 2009, from China by Jay Pasachoff
 Enewetak, Marshall Islands. Prof. Druckmüller's eclipse photography site
 MTSAT-1R visible satellite imagery of the solar eclipse shadow (CIMSS Satellite Blog)
 The 2009 Eclipse in China
 
 August 8, 2009, Diamonds in a Cloudy Sky, totality in clouds from Wuhan, China APOD

External links

 

2009 in science
2009 07 22
July 2009 events
2009 in India
2009 in Nepal
2009 in China